The 1948 Swedish Ice Hockey Championship was the 26th season of the Swedish Ice Hockey Championship, the national championship of Sweden. IK Göta won the championship.

Tournament

First Qualification round 
 Tegs SK - Clemensnäs IF 1:9
 Piteå IF - Wifsta/Östrands IF 5:5/5:11

Second Qualification round 
 IF Fellows - Forshaga IF 0:6
 Clemensnäs IF - IK Warpen 4:3
 Wifsta/Östrand - IFK Nyland 6:3

First round
 IK Sturehov - Tranebergs IF (W)
 IK Sirius - Hofors IK 3:2
 IFK Mariefred - Nacka SK 3:6
 Åkers IF - Djurgårdens IF (W)
 Forshaga IF - Atlas Diesel 13:4
 Wifsta/Östrands IF - Clemensnäs IF 2:5
 Västerås SK - Surahammars IF 3:6
 IF Olympia - Karlbergs BK 2:4

Second round
 Tranebergs IF - Clemensnäs IF 3:4
 Forshaga IF - IK Göta 4:5
 Surahammars IF - AIK 3:8
 Hammarby IF - Karlbergs BK 6:0
 Mora IK - Gävle GIK 4:7
 VIK Västerås HK - Djurgårdens IF 1:16
 UoIF Matteuspojkarna - Nacka SK 4:3
 IK Sirius - Södertälje SK 3:10

Quarterfinals 
 Clemensnäs IF - IK Göta 3:6
 AIK - Hammarby IF 3:2
 Gävle GIK - Djurgårdens IF 4:3
 UoIF Matteuspojkarna - Södertälje SK 4:3

Semifinals 
 IK Göta - AIK 5:3
 Gävle GIK - UoIF Matteuspojkarna 5:7

Final 
 IK Göta - UoIF Matteuspojkarna 3:2 n.V.

External links
 Season on hockeyarchives.info

Cham
Swedish Ice Hockey Championship seasons